Bang Nam Chuet is a tambon (sub-district) of Mueang Samut Sakhon District, Samut Sakhon Province, a part of Bangkok Metropolitan Region.

Geography
Its name "Bang Nam Chuet" (also spelled Bang Num Jeud) means "place of freshwater", owing the condition of the area.

The general topography of the sub-district is a river basin. There are many natural khlongs (canal) flowing through every village. The soil condition is depleted soil. Khlong Si Wa Ta Klom, Khlong Bang Nam Chuet, Khlong Thep Kanchana, Khlong Pathumanon, Khlong Khut Mai, Khlong Liap Tang Rotfai, Khlong Khok Krabue are the main water sources.

The area surrounded by other sub-districts are all in Samut Sakhon Province, namely (from the north clockwise): Khae Rai in Krathum Baen District, Phanthai Norasing and Khok Krabue in its district, Bang Bon Tai in Bang Bon District and Samae Dam in Bang Khun Thian District of Bangkok are in the south, respectively. Bang Nam Chuet is a northeasternmost part in the province.

It has a total area of  18.73 km2 (11,707 rais).

Administration
Bang Nam Chuet is administered by the Subdistrict Administrative Organization Bang Nam Chuet (องค์การบริหารส่วนตำบลบางน้ำจืด).

Bang Nam Chuet also consists of six administrative mubans (village).

Population
It has a total population of 11,525 people (5,625 men, 5,900 women) in 2,156 households, an average density of 583 people/ km2.

Most of the population is employed in the industrial sector.

Public utilities
It has three primary schools, one high school, one vocational school, two Buddhist temples, two Christian churches.

In public health and life safety, Bang Nam Chuet includes two local hospitals, one private hospital, one modern dispensary, one police station, one fire station.

There is electricity in every house in this sub-district.

Places of interest
Wat Pho Jae
Suksanareewittaya School (formerly and still colloquially known as Suksanaree 2 School) (shared with Bang Bon Tai Sub-district, Bang Bon District)
Wat Phanthai Norasing
Bangnumjeud Stadium

Transportation
Because it is an area adjacent to Bangkok, therefore, Bang Nam Chuet has convenient transportation. Ekkachai (Highway 3242) and Rama II Roads (Highway 35) pass through the area. The area served by many bus lines, both from the Bangkok Mass Transit Authority and affiliated bus companies, including 105, 120 (air cond.) 7, 68, 105, 141, as well as many local minibuses.

The affiliated bus line 43, used to serve from Thewet in Bangkok to the end at Suksanareewittaya School on Ekkachai Road, but the service has been stopped since April 27, 2021 because of the impact of the COVID-19 crisis.

Bang Nam Chuet is crossed by the Maeklong Line of the State Railway of Thailand (SRT) with two railway halts: Bangnamjued (as spelled according to sign)   from Wongwian Yai Station (departure of Maeklong Line) and  Thung Si Thong  from Wongwian Yai Station.

References 

Tambon of Samut Sakhon Province